Isaac Husik (10 February 1876 – 22 March 1939) (Hebrew: יצחק הוזיק) was a Jewish historian, translator, and student of philosophy, one of the first three individuals to serve as official faculty at Gratz College in Philadelphia.

Biography
Husik  was born in Vasseutinez near Kyiv, Russian Empire, on 10 February 1876. Because of the worsening climate under the Russian imperial May Laws, in 1888, when he was 12 years old, he moved with his mother to Philadelphia. His father, the teacher Wolf Husik, rejoined them the following year. Isaac received his early instruction from his father and from Sabato Morais, rabbi at the Sephardic congregation Kahal Kadosh Mikveh Israel in Philadelphia, and one of the founders of the Jewish Theological Seminary (JTS). Husik attended JTS while preparing for secular studies, and received direct guidance from Morais, but did not ultimately pursue a rabbinical career.

Husik attended Central High School (Philadelphia), and then enrolled at University of Pennsylvania, where he received a master's degree in mathematics in 1899. Ultimately, however, his interests turned to the study of the classics, especially Aristotle, and he received his Ph.D. in philosophy from University of Pennsylvania in 1903. His thesis, entitled Judah Messer Leon's Commentary on the Vetus Logica, was published in Leyden in 1906.

While still a student at Penn, Husik accepted an Instructorship in Hebrew and Bible at Gratz College, but simultaneously remained an instructor in philosophy at Penn. He eventually left Gratz, and was appointed full professor of philosophy at Penn in 1922. He taught classes also at Yeshiva College, Hebrew Union College, and Columbia University Summer School.

In 1923, Husik was appointed editor of the Jewish Publication Society of America, in which capacity he served until his death.  He additionally served in a wide range of voluntary communal positions, and married Rose Gorfine late in life. He died suddenly at the age of 63. The philosopher Leo Strauss called him in his "Preface to Isaac Husik, Philosophical Essays: Ancient, Medieval, and Modern" (1952): "one of the most distinguished historians of philosophy America had produced".

Works
Husik's best known work is A History of Mediaeval Jewish Philosophy  (Jewish Publication Society, 1916, and several times thereafter), which was considered at the time to be a pioneering effort in English-language scholarship.   Like Julius Guttmann's Philosophies of Judaism, Husik's book offers rather thin treatment of mystical topics and thinkers, instead favoring the rational face of Jewish thought.  Husik had extensive knowledge of Hebrew, Arabic, German, and Greek, and relied heavily on primary sources in these languages when available.

A History of Mediaeval Jewish Philosophy discusses the philosophies of the following individuals: 
 Isaac Israeli
 David ben Merwan al-Mukkamas
 Saadia ben Joseph al-Fayyumi
 Joseph al-Basir
 Joshua ben Judah
 Solomon ibn Gabirol
 Bahya ibn Pakuda 
 Pseudo-Bahya
 Abraham bar Hiyya
 Joseph ibn Zaddik
 Judah Halevi
 Moses ibn Ezra
 Abraham ibn Ezra
 Abraham ibn Daud
 Moses Maimonides
 Hillel ben Samuel
 Levi ben Gerson
 Aaron ben Elijah of Nicomedia
 Hasdai ben Abraham Crescas
 Joseph Albo

Among Husik's other works are a translation of Joseph Albo's Book of Principles (ספר העקרים) in five volumes, which restores many passages removed by Christian censors, a translation of von Ihering's Law as a Means to an End (Zweck im Recht), and a translation of Stammler's The Theory of Justice.

References

External links 
 
 

1876 births
1939 deaths
19th-century American writers
20th-century American writers
Jewish American writers
Gratz College
Yeshiva University faculty
Hebrew Union College – Jewish Institute of Religion faculty
Columbia University faculty
University of Pennsylvania alumni
Emigrants from the Russian Empire to the United States
Central High School (Philadelphia) alumni